Milton David Barnes (born November 29, 1957) is an American basketball coach who was the former head coach of the U.S. Virgin Islands national basketball team.

Early life and education
Born in Oakley, Michigan, Barnes graduated from Saginaw High School in 1975 and Albion College in 1979. At Albion, Barnes played basketball for four seasons and led Albion to the 1978 Michigan Intercollegiate Athletic Association title and third place in the 1978 NCAA Division III tournament.

Coaching career
He was an assistant coach at the University of Minnesota from 1986 to 1988 and 1991 to 1996 under Clem Haskins. He later became head coach of Albion High School, where he compiled a 65–11 record from 1988 to 1991, including a 26–1 record and a Class B state championship game appearance in his final season. Also, he is the former head coach of Eastern Michigan University and of the world famous Harlem Globetrotters. He also coached the NBDL's Greenville Groove  to a league championship. Barnes was also associate head coach at SMU from 2007 to 2009. 

In 2009, the Minnesota Timberwolves hired Barnes as a scout. In 2010, he became the men’s basketball head coach of U.S. Virgin Islands national basketball team.

Personal life
Barnes and his wife Lyn have three children; sons Andre and Milton Jr. and a daughter Alexis. His son Andre is a student-athlete in track and field at Michigan.

Head coaching record

College

Professional

|- ! style="background:#FDE910;"
| align="left" |Greenville
| align="left" |2001–02
|56||36||20||||| 1st in NBDL||5||4||1||||Won NBDL Championship
|-class="sortbottom"
| align="center" colspan=2|Career
|56||36||20|||||  ||5||4||1||||

References

1957 births
Living people
Albion Britons men's basketball players
Basketball coaches from Michigan
Basketball players from Michigan
American men's basketball players
Detroit Mercy Titans men's basketball coaches
Eastern Michigan Eagles men's basketball coaches
Eastern Michigan Eagles men's basketball players
Greenville Groove coaches
Harlem Globetrotters coaches
High school basketball coaches in Michigan
Kent State Golden Flashes men's basketball coaches
Minnesota Golden Gophers men's basketball coaches
Sportspeople from Saginaw, Michigan
SMU Mustangs men's basketball coaches